Mykhailo Albertovych Fedorov (born 21 January 1991) is a Ukrainian politician, and businessman. He served as Vice Prime Minister of Ukraine and Minister of Digital Transformation from 2019 to March 2023.

Biography 
Fedorov graduated from Zaporizhzhya National University. In 2012 during a local student festival "2012 Student Republic", he was elected a "student mayor of Zaporizhzhia" at the festival replacing Andriy Bondarenko.

Fedorov is the founder of SMM Studio.

In 2014 Fedorov as a member of 5.10 political party unsuccessfully ran for the Verkhovna Rada (Ukraine's national parliament) in 2014 Ukrainian parliamentary election being 166th on the party list (at its tail). The 5.10 political party (leader Hennadiy Balashov) did not pass the 5% passing threshold gaining only 42% during elections and placing 14th place among participating parties.

Following the 2019 Ukrainian presidential election Fedorov became an advisor to President Volodymyr Zelenskyy.

Fedorov was on a party list of the Servant of the People political party during the 2019 Ukrainian parliamentary election, yet himself is not a registered member of the party (non-partisan, according to the Central Election Commission). Fedorov was elected to the Verkhovna Rada in the election.

On 29 August 2019 Fedorov was appointed as Minister of Digital Transformation in the Honcharuk Government. He surrendered his deputy mandate upon his ministerial appointment. Fedorov's most important project as minister was set to be the so-called "state in a smartphone" project that was aiming that by 2024 100% of all government services should be available online with 20% of services provided automatically, without the intervention of an official, and 1 online fill-in form to receive a package of services "in any life situation". On 5 November 2019 Fedorov wrote on Facebook that the "state in a smartphone" project would not be funded by the state budget in 2020 (but he hoped it would be in 2021) but that it would rely "on an effective team and international technical assistance, public-private partnerships, volunteering." The following day Prime Minister Oleksiy Honcharuk stressed that each government ministry had planned expenditures for digitization and that the Ministry of Digital Transformation did have a separate budget and that thus the state budget was sufficient to launch the "state in a smartphone" project in 2020.

In August-September 2022, Fedorov attended the Digital Transformation Strategy training course at the Yale School of Management.

Fedorov was dismissed as Minister on 20 March 2023 by parliament. The same day the Verkhovna Rada received Prime Minister Denys Shmyhal's submissions on the appointment of Fedorov as the Deputy Prime Minister for Innovation, Development of Education, Science and Technology, Minister of Digital Transformation.

Services and projects 
Together with the team, he launched a number of services and projects:

 Diia is a portal and application that allows users to receive public services online. More than 70 public services are available on the portal, 15 digital documents and 23 services in the application, including the world’s first official digital passport. The number of users reached 19.4 million of Diia web portal and 18 million Ukrainians of Diia application, respectively.
 Diia.Business – a platform for supporting businesses. Business owners can get free consultations and find ideas for development. The platform has already provided more than 14 500 specialized consultations.
 Diia.Centers – a network of places where Ukrainians can get administrative services, advice on online services, doing business, etc. As of now 26 Diia.Centers operate in Ukraine.
 Diia.City – a special legal space with the lowest taxes for IT companies. More than 340 companies with over 24,000 professionals have already joined.
 Diia.Digital Education is an online platform with free digital literacy courses. There are 75 courses available on the platform with more than 1.3 million users.

 E-Residency – status for foreigners, which allows conducting business in Ukraine online without a physical presence in the country. E-residents have the opportunity to get favourable taxation conditions.

 COVID-certificates. In a few clicks, a certificate immediately appears on the smartphone and is accepted everywhere in Europe. Ukrainians have generated more than 12 million certificates.

 eMalyatko – A 10-in-1 service for parents of newborns. One application to register a child and receive 10 services without visiting any offices. For example, a parent can get registration of place of residence and assignment of birth allowance. As of July 2022, more than 270 thousand parents have used the eMalyatko service.

 eAid – financial aid program for business, initiated by the President of Ukraine. This service has become an innovation both for Ukraine and the world: payments can be received in a few clicks. Also, it is the most comprehensive public service in the history of Ukraine, as it engages the state, banks and businesses. More than 9.3 million Ukrainians have applied via Diia for receiving UAH 1,000 within the eAid program.

 Internet-Subvention – project, that helped 1 million Ukrainians and 7,000 social facilities in 3,000 villages to get a connection to the optical Internet.

 A laptop for every teacher – initiative of the Ministry of Digital Transformation and the Ministry of Education and Science of Ukraine, which aims to digitize education. More than 61 thousand Ukrainian teachers received modern laptops.

 Digitization of services has an effective and proven anti-corruption effect.  As of February 2022, the state has saved more than UAH 14.7 billion thanks to the digitization of public services. Potential savings, after all the services become digital, will amount to UAH 42 billion.

Activities during full-scale invasion 
During the full-scale invasion, the following projects were implemented:

 Services and products in Diia, that are most relevant to Ukrainians now. Among them – obtain the unemployment status and apply for unemployment benefits; file a 2% declaration and pay taxes; report on damaged/destroyed property; to receive a temporary document for the martial law period – eDocument, etc.
 Expanded eAid service - Ukrainians in the areas where the most active hostilities were taking place, were able to receive 6,500 UAH of support from the state. UAH 30.9 billion were issued to 5 million Ukrainians.
 UNITED24 – a fundraising platform for donations from all over the world to support Ukraine. Thanks to these funds, military and humanitarian needs of the state are fulfilling. All funds are distributed in three areas: defence and demining; humanitarian and medical aid; and rebuild Ukraine.  For example, due to the donation raised it became possible to purchase a helicopter for evacuation of the seriously injured; 44K helmets; 48K units of bodyarmor; 7 special vehicles for the military; 35 portable ALV apparatuses for medics working in the frontline. And this is just the beginning. 
 The Army of Drones is a comprehensive program developed by the Ministry of Defence jointly with the General Staff. The project procures drones for the Armes Forces of Ukraine, repairs drones and provides systematic training for drone operators. As of now, team has signed contracts to purchase UAVs for over 1,1 bln UAH. People also donate their own drones for the needs of the AFU. 
 PayPal started its operation in Ukraine. In February, Mykhailo Fedorov appealed to PayPal CEO Dan Shulman to leave the Russian market.  The company not only left the market, but also allowed the commission-free transfers for Ukrainian users until June 30. In June, the period of transfers without fees was extended until the end of September. The total amount of money that has been transferred and received by Ukrainians is over $200 million.

Collaboration with Elon Musk 
A few days after Russia invaded, Mykhailo Fedorov asked Elon Musk to provide Ukraine with Starlink stations. There are now over 18K Starlinks, operating in Ukraine, providing critical infrastructure, government agencies, etc with a stable Internet connection. The SpaceX team has also updated the software to reduce power consumption so that Starlink can be powered from a car cigarette lighter. Given the number of terminals and their demand, SpaceX decided to open a representative office in Ukraine. On June 9, Starlink Ukraine received official registration as on operator.

In addition to Starlink, Elon Musk handed over Tesla Powerwalls to Ukraine. These batteries can serve as emergency power supplies during power outages and are combined with solar cells for off-grid electricity generation. They are used in settlements most affected by the Russian occupation. This solution came in handy as there were a lot of situations where there was a need to get critical infrastructure running again, rather than waiting for power to be restored. Since the start of the full-scale invasion, Ukraine has received 44 Tesla Powerwalls.

Cyberwar 
According to Mykhailo Fedorov, the term "cyberwar" will soon become official in the world.  Ukraine participates in it and is confidently winning. To this end, the Ministry of Digital Transformation team has done the following:

 Digital Blockade of the Russian Federation. Since the beginning of the full-scale war, the Ministry of Digital Transformation has been appealing to tech companies to stop operating in Russia. In total, over 600 companies are being approached, about 150 responded to the request, and 78 left the Russian market completely. 
 IT-army – more than 250K volunteers from all over the world united to fight the enemy, and show that the only possible future for Russia will be: as slow as possible and without any modern digital tools. Since the start of the full-scale invasion, the IT army has attacked more than 7000 online resources and this number is increasing every day.  Among them are RuTube, the Russian Post, Sberbank, State Procurement, etc.
 eVorog – a chatbot where Ukrainians can report on the movement of invaders, their war crimes and collaborators. Also Ukrainians can report information about explosive and suspicious objects, and mines in particular. This will help with defining our country. Currently, more than 350K people have already used the chatbot.  Thanks to the information received within eVorog, the Armed Forces has been able to conduct a number of successful operations.  Also, the chatbot received information about more than 30 war crimes.
 Artificial Intelligence Photo Identification – Ministry of Digital Transformation identificated quite a few looting Russian soldiers with the help of AI algorithms. The algorithms also identified more than 300 photos of murdered invaders.  And with the help of social engineering, they found many people, who were associated with this war to inform them of the death of a loved one and ask them to refuse to go to war.

Awards 
 Order of Merit of the III degree for outstanding achievements in economic, scientific, social and cultural, military, state, public and other spheres of public activities for the benefit of Ukraine.
 Mykhailo Fedorov entered the POLITICO Tech 28 rating of European digital leaders and took first place in the Rulebreakers category.
 The Diia brand has won two awards at the British D&AD Awards in the "Local Solution" and "Digital Design" categories.
 Diia.City received the Red Dot Award in two categories: Brand Experience and Logo Design (2022).
 Diia was awarded the bronze statuette of the Cannes Lions in the category Creative Business Transformation (2022).
 The Ministry of Digital Transformation team received the "Creative Civil Servants" award at the annual "Creative Bureaucracy" Festival.
 Ukraine and personally Mykhailo Fedorov were noted at the CYBERSEC European Cybersecurity Forum.  They received two awards: for heroic resistance to Russian aggression and for defense of the digital boundaries of the democratic world.
 Diia.City won the Emerging Europe Awards in the category Modern and Future-Proof Policymaking.
 The Ministry's of the digital transformation team received two awards in the Telecom Ukraine 2021: Telecom Challеnge for special achievements in the development of the telecom industry and victory in the "Discovery of the Year" category for the "Internet Subvention" project.
 The Diia portal received an award from the Red Dot Design Award (2020).

See also 
 Honcharuk Government
 List of members of the parliament of Ukraine, 2019–24

References

External links 

 

1991 births
Living people
People from Vasylivka
Ukrainian IT businesspeople
21st-century Ukrainian businesspeople
Presidential advisors
Ninth convocation members of the Verkhovna Rada
Servant of the People (political party) politicians
Vice Prime Ministers of Ukraine
21st-century Ukrainian politicians
Digital transformation ministers of Ukraine
Recipients of the Order of Merit (Ukraine), 3rd class
E-government in Ukraine